Finland competed at the 2018 Winter Paralympics in PyeongChang, South Korea, from 9 to 18 March 2018.

Medalists 
Finnish Paralympic Committee has announced a medal target of 3 medals, which Finland managed to win.

|align="left" valign="top"|

| width="22%" align="left" valign="top" |

Alpine skiing

Men

Biathlon

Men

Women

Cross-country skiing

Distance
Men

Women

Mixed

Sprint
Men

Women

Snowboarding

Banked slalom

Snowboard cross

Wheelchair curling

Summary

Round-robin
Finland has a bye in draws 1, 3, 8, 11, 13 and 15.

Draw 2
Saturday, 10 March, 19:35

Draw 4
Sunday, 11 March, 14:35

Draw 5
Sunday, 11 March, 19:35

Draw 6
Monday, 12 March, 9:35

Draw 7
Monday, 12 March, 14:35

Draw 9
Tuesday, 13 March, 9:35

Draw 10
Tuesday, 13 March, 14:35

Draw 12
Wednesday, 14 March, 9:35

Draw 14
Wednesday, 14 March, 19:35

Draw 16
Thursday, 15 March, 14:35

Draw 17
Thursday, 15 March, 19:35

See also
 Finland at the 2018 Winter Olympics

References

Nations at the 2018 Winter Paralympics
2018
Paralympics